Tegermansu Pass or Tigarman Su Pass (Kotal-e Tegermansu) is a closed mountain pass on the border between Afghanistan and China in Wakhan Corridor, in the Hindu Kush  —  Pamir mountain range. It is located between the Tegermansu Valley on the eastern end of the Little Pamir and Chalachigu Valley in Xinjiang, China. Historically, it was one of the three routes between China and Wakhan.

On Chinese side, there is a Chinese border post in the valley below. There have been proposals and plans by Kashgar regional government to open this pass as a port of entry for economic purposes since the 1990s. However, this has yet to happen.

Tegerman Su is the name of the river valley on the Afghan side, easternmost part of Afghanistan. During the late 2000s, due to lawlessness, the Kirghiz in Afghanistan reported robbery and theft in Little Pamir by bandits from Tajikistan.

See also
 Afghanistan-China border
 Wakhjir Pass
 Beyik Pass 
 Kilik Pass 
 Mintaka Pass 
 China–Tajikistan border
 China–Pakistan border

Notes

References 

Mountain passes of China
Mountain passes of Afghanistan
Mountain passes of Xinjiang
Afghanistan–China border
Mountain passes of the Pamir